Åcon is an annual science fiction convention, held in May or June every year in Mariehamn, Åland. It was founded in 2007 with the goal of bringing Swedish and Finnish science fiction fandom together, and described as being a literary relaxacon with all programming in English. While a few of the participants are Ålanders, the majority travel from mainland Finland and Sweden for the convention.

Guests of honour

References

Science fiction conventions in Europe
Tourist attractions in Åland
Recurring events established in 2007